"Noise" is a single by Finnish symphonic metal band Nightwish, the first from their ninth album Human. :II: Nature.. It was released with an accompanying video on February 7, 2020. The single is the band's first published song to feature the drummer Kai Hahto as a full-time member, following the departure of Jukka Nevalainen in July 2019.

Lyrical content 
The track has been described as a commentary on modern society. Following the music video's release, when asked if the video was criticism towards technology or cell phones, Tuomas responded:

Track listing 
Vinyl version

Personnel

Nightwish 
 Floor Jansenlead vocals
 Emppu Vuorinenguitars
 Marko Hietalabass, male vocals, acoustic guitar, backing vocals
 Tuomas Holopainenkeyboards, piano
 Troy Donockleyuilleann pipes, tin whistle, low whistle, bouzouki, guitars, male vocals, backing vocals
 Kai Hahtodrums

Additional personnel 

 Tuomas Holopainenproduction, recording, mixing
 Tero Kinnunen, Mikko Karmilaproduction, recording, mixing
 Mika Jussilamastering

Charts

References 

2020 songs
Nightwish songs
Songs written by Tuomas Holopainen
Nuclear Blast Records singles